In Aztec mythology, Huehuecóyotl   (from huēhueh  "very old"  (literally, "old old") and coyōtl  "coyote" in Nahuatl) is the auspicious Pre-Columbian god of music, dance, mischief, and  song. He is the patron of uninhibited sexuality and rules over the day sign in the Aztec calendar named cuetzpallin (lizard) and the fourth trecena Xochitl ("flower" in Nahuatl).

History 
Stories derived from the Codex Telleriano-Remensis characterized Huehuecóyotl as a benign prankster, whose tricks were often played on other gods or even humans, but tended to backfire and cause more trouble for himself than for the intended victims. A great party-giver, he also was alleged to create wars among humans to relieve his boredom. He was a part of the Tezcatlipoca (Smoky Mirror) family of the Mexica gods and inherited their shapeshifting powers.

Those who had indications of evil fates from other gods would sometimes appeal to Huehuecóyotl to mitigate or reverse their fates. Huehuecóyotl shares many characteristics with the trickster Coyote of the North American tribes, including storytelling and choral singing.

Like all Aztec deities, Huehuecóyotl was dualistic in his exercise of good and evil and was perceived as a balanced god. Depictions of his dark side include a coyote appearance (non-human) with black or yellow feathers, as opposed to the customary green feathers.

He is also the god of deception.

About 

Huehuecóyotl (or Ueuecoyotl) is a Mexican mythology deity. He is depicted in the Codex Borbonicus as a dancing coyote with human hands and feet, accompanied by a human drummer. The name "very old coyote" conveyed positive meanings to the Aztecs; coyotes were a symbol of astuteness, worldly wisdom, pragmatism, male beauty, and youthfulness. The prefix "huehue", which in Nahuatl means "very old", was attached to gods in Aztec mythology that were revered for their old age, wisdom, philosophical insights, and connections to the divine. Although Huehuecóyotl often appears in stories as male, he can change gender much like many of the offspring of Tezcatlipoca can. He also can be associated with indulgence, male sexuality, good luck and story-telling. One of his prominent female lovers was Temazcalteci (also Temaxcaltechi), the goddess of bathing and sweat baths (temazcalli), also known as Mexican sauna. Another was Xochiquetzal, the goddess of love, beauty, female sexuality, prostitutes, flowers, and young mothers.

In most depictions of Huehuecóyotl, he is followed by a human drummer or groups of humans that appear to be friendly to him (as opposed to worshiping), which is exceptional in Mesoamerican culture.

The fourth day of the twenty-day calendar cycle belonged to Huehuecóyotl.

References

External links

Karl Young, The Continuum of Life in Codex Borbonicus

Arts gods
Aztec gods
Animal gods
Love and lust gods
Mythological canines
Shapeshifting
Trickster gods
LGBT themes in mythology
Coyotes in religion
Music and singing gods
Dance gods